is a Japanese bobsledder. He competed in the two man and the four man events at the 2002 Winter Olympics.

References

1975 births
Living people
Japanese male bobsledders
Olympic bobsledders of Japan
Bobsledders at the 2002 Winter Olympics
Sportspeople from Miyagi Prefecture